Eloy Abreu Morales (born 2 July 1956) is a Cuban wrestler. He competed in the 1976 Summer Olympics.

References

1956 births
Living people
Wrestlers at the 1976 Summer Olympics
Cuban male sport wrestlers
Olympic wrestlers of Cuba
Pan American Games medalists in wrestling
Pan American Games gold medalists for Cuba
Wrestlers at the 1975 Pan American Games
Medalists at the 1975 Pan American Games
20th-century Cuban people
21st-century Cuban people